Sunrise Lake may refer to a location in North America:

Water bodies:
Sunrise Lake (New Hampshire), United States
Sunrise Lake (Vancouver Island), British Columbia, Canada

Community:
Sunrise Lake, Pennsylvania, United States, a census-designated place